Hellenthal is a municipality in the district of Euskirchen in the state of North Rhine-Westphalia, Germany. It is located in the Eifel hills, near the border with Belgium, approx. 30 km south-west of Euskirchen and 40 km south-east of Aachen.

The village of Reifferscheid, part of the municipality of Hellenthal, is dominated by the ruins of  Reifferscheid Castle, the seat of a medieval principality, see Salm. Another village within the municipality, Blumenthal, features ironworks industry area.

References

External links 

Municipalities in North Rhine-Westphalia
Euskirchen (district)